Clavigo may refer to:

 Clavigo (play), a 1774 play by Goethe
 Clavigo (film), a 1970 movie based on Goethe's play
 Clavigo, a 1999 ballet by Roland Petit
 Clavigo, a 1999 ballet by Tim Rushton